The 2012 CollegeInsider.com Postseason Tournament (CIT) was a postseason single-elimination tournament of 32 NCAA Division I teams, up from 24 teams in the 2011 CIT. The CIT began with 16 first-round games. Games took place March 13–28, 2012.

32 participants who were not invited to the 2012 NCAA tournament, the 2012 National Invitation Tournament, or the 2012 College Basketball Invitational made up the field.  The winner of the 2012 Great West Conference men's basketball tournament, North Dakota, received an automatic bid to the tournament.

All games, except for the championship game, were streamed online by America One Sports. Free registration was required to view the games. The championship game was once again broadcast nationally by Fox College Sports on FCS Central.

The tournament was won by Mercer who defeated Utah State in the championship game 70–67. This was the first post-season tournament win for a men's basketball team from the Atlantic Sun Conference.

Participating teams
The following teams received an invitation to the 2012 CIT:

Format
The fourth annual CIT used the old NIT model in which matchups in future rounds were determined by the results of the previous round.

Bracket
Bracket is for visual purposes only. The CIT does not have a set bracket.
 

Home teams are listed second.
* Denotes overtime period.

References

CollegeInsider.com Postseason Tournament
CollegeInsider.com Postseason Tournament
2012 in sports in Utah
College basketball tournaments in Utah
Logan, Utah